Tidal Wave is the debut studio album by Canadian indie pop rock band Young Liars. It was released June 24, 2014 via Nettwerk.

Track listing

References

2014 albums
Young Liars (band) albums